Pea Brook is a river in Delaware County and Sullivan County in New York. It flows into the Delaware River in Long Eddy.

References

Rivers of New York (state)
Rivers of Delaware County, New York
Rivers of Sullivan County, New York